Livingston York Yourtee "Hop" Hopkins (7 July 1846 – 21 August 1927) was an American-born cartoonist who became a major figure in Australian cartooning during the period surrounding the Federation of Australia. He is best known for his work with The Bulletin. He is also notable for drawing one of the earliest newspaper comic strips, Professor Tigwissel's Burglar Alarm.

Early life 
Hopkins was born in Bellefontaine, Ohio, son of Daniel Hopkins (1800–1849), surveyor, and his wife Sarah, née Carter. He was the thirteenth of 14 children. His family were Methodists, and his upbringing was somewhat hard and puritanical. When his father died, his mother was left with a home and a small estate. The boy went to the district school, and from the age of 14 years worked at various avocations until 1864 when he enlisted in the 130th Ohio Volunteer Regiment to fight in the American Civil War when 17 years old. He had very little active service, as the regiment's term of service was only three months.

Career in the United States 
After the war Hopkins went to Toledo, Ohio, where some sketches he had made were shown to the proprietor of the Toledo Blade. As a result, he was engaged as an illustrator, which led to an appointment on Scribner's Weekly. During this engagement he had a few months training in drawing. Hopkins then went to New York City, where some of his drawings were accepted by Judge and the New York Daily Graphic, and he also wrote and illustrated A Comic History of United States. This was published in good time for the centennial celebrations in 1876, but in the patriotism of the time the book was unfavourably reviewed, and it was a failure. Hopkins married Harriet Augusta Commager on 9 June 1875 in Toledo and they had three children. Hopkins published in Puck and continued his freelance work for a period of 13 years and did a large amount of work for St. Nicholas Magazine and for the Harper publications, the Weekly, the Magazine, the Bazaar and Young People. He was also commissioned to illustrate editions of Don Quixote, Gulliver's Travels, Baron Munchausen, and Knickerbocker's History of New York. Towards the end of 1882 William Henry Traill called on him and offered him a two-year contract as cartoonist on The Bulletin in Australia. The offer was accepted.

Life in Australia 
Hopkins arrived in Sydney on 9 February 1883 with his family and worked for The Bulletin until his retirement in 1913. A constant stream of clever illustrations came from his pen, and he contributed not a little to the power wielded by The Bulletin in its most vigorous days. A selection of his drawings was published in 1904 under the title of On the Hop. Among his best known creations were the Little Boy from Manly in April 1885, "I thought I had a stamp", and the many George Reid drawings. Reproductions of three of his etchings show that he had an excellent sense of the capabilities of that medium. He also occasionally painted in oil or water-colours. After 1913 the volume of his work for The Bulletin gradually diminished, but he kept his interest in the journal of which he was now part-proprietor and director. He busied himself with making violins, gardening, music and playing bowls. He died on 21 August 1927 at Mosman, Sydney, aged 81 and was survived by a son and four daughters.

References

External links 

 
Portrait, National Library of Australia
HOPKINS, LIVINGSTON (1846-1927) Biographical Page, National Library of Australia.
Australian political cartooning - a rich tradition Australian Government Culture and Recreation Portal.

1846 births
1927 deaths
American cartoonists
Australian cartoonists
American caricaturists
American comics artists
Australian caricaturists
Australian comics artists
American emigrants to Australia
People of Ohio in the American Civil War
People from Bellefontaine, Ohio
Burials at Rookwood Cemetery